Francesco Di Nolfo (born 4 July 1998) is an Italian football player.

Club career
He made his professional debut in the Serie B for Perugia on 10 September 2016 in a game against Brescia.

References

External links
 

1998 births
Footballers from Rome
Living people
Italian footballers
Italy youth international footballers
A.C. Perugia Calcio players
A.C. Prato players
Serie B players
Serie C players
Association football forwards